Stanislav Salamovich Cherchesov (born 2 September 1963) is a Russian football manager and former international footballer who played as a goalkeeper for Soviet Union and Russia. He is currently managing Hungarian team Ferencváros. 

In August 2016 he was appointed as head coach of the Russia national team and helped his team reach the quarter-finals of the 2018 FIFA World Cup. He was dismissed from the Russian national team after the team was eliminated in the UEFA Euro 2020 group stage.

Club career 
The goalkeeper played 57 matches in the German top-flight for former East German powerhouse Dynamo Dresden a couple of years after reunification between East and West.

International career
Cherchesov played for Russia at the 1994 World Cup and 1996 Euro. He also was named to the squad for the 2002 FIFA World Cup, but was an unused substitute. He made 39 appearances for the team after the dissolution of the Soviet Union. Cherchesov also made one appearance for the FIFA team in the charity game against America in 1995, and for Europe vs Africa in 1997.

Managerial career
Cherchesov was the manager of FC Kufstein from January to November 2004 and the manager of FC Wacker Tirol from November 2004 to May 2006. In June 2006 – June 2007 he was the sporting director of FC Spartak Moscow. From 19 June 2007 to 14 August 2008 he was the manager of FC Spartak Moscow. On July 12, 2008, Spartak suffered a historic crushing defeat against CSKA with a score of 1:5. On August 13, 2008, Spartak lost another crucial match to Dynamo Kyiv with a score of 1: 4 in the Champions League qualification. The next day, general director Valery Karpin announced the dismissal of the head coach of the team - Cherchesov Stanislav. Manager of Amkar Perm since June 2013 to April 2014.

On 8 April 2014, Cherchesov left Amkar Perm.

On 9 April 2014, Cherchesov was named as manager of FC Dynamo Moscow replacing Dan Petrescu. He left Dynamo by mutual consent on 13 July 2015.

On 6 October 2015, he became the manager of Polish side Legia Warsaw. That season he won the top Polish professional league championship and Cup double for Legia Warsaw

In August 2016, Cherchesov was named as the new head coach of Russia on a two-year contract through to the 2018 FIFA World Cup. Under his management Russia would beat Saudi Arabia 5–0, Egypt 3–1, and Spain 1-1 (pen. 4-3), reaching the quarterfinals for the first time since 1970. He has become the first ever Russian manager, since the collapse of USSR, to bring Russia into the knockout stage of a major tournament for the second time (Dutchman Guus Hiddink led Russia to the UEFA Euro 2008 semi-finals), which others like Pavel Sadyrin, Oleg Romantsev, Georgi Yartsev and Leonid Slutsky have failed to do.

On 27 July 2018, he signed a new contract with the Russian national team, on a two-year term with a further two-year extension option. On 12 March 2020, he extended the contract until 30 December 2022. It would be extended to 31 July 2024 if Russia qualifies for the knockout stage at the 2022 FIFA World Cup.

Following the failure to advance from the group stage at the UEFA Euro 2020 which was played in June 2021, the Russian Football Union dismissed Cherchesov on 8 July 2021.

Ferencváros
On 20 December 2021, he was appointed as the manager of the Nemzeti Bajnokság I club Ferencvárosi TC.

Personal life
Cherchesov is married and has two children. His son, Stanislav, is also a goalkeeper. As he spent much time in Germany and Austria during his career, he is fluent in German and has taken up coaching education in Germany.

He was named "Coach of the Year" in the nomination "Pride of Russia" by the Ministry of Sport of Russia.

Managerial statistics

Honours

Player
Spartak Moscow
 Soviet Top League/Russian Premier League: 1987, 1989, 1992, 1993
 Soviet Cup: 1992

FC Tirol Insbruck
 Austrian Bundesliga: 1999–2000, 2000–01, 2001–02

Individual
 Soviet Top League Best Goalkeeper: 1989, 1990, 1992

Manager
Legia Warsaw
 Ekstraklasa: 2015–16
 Polish Cup: 2015–16

Ferencváros
 Nemzeti Bajnokság I: 2021–22
 Hungarian Cup: 2021–22

References

External links

 
Profile at RussiaTeam 

1963 births
Living people
People from Alagirsky District
Ossetian people
Ossetian footballers
Soviet footballers
Soviet Union international footballers
Russian footballers
Russian football managers
Russia international footballers
Dual internationalists (football)
UEFA Euro 1992 players
1994 FIFA World Cup players
UEFA Euro 1996 players
2002 FIFA World Cup players
FC Spartak Vladikavkaz players
FC Spartak Moscow players
FC Lokomotiv Moscow players
Dynamo Dresden players
Soviet Top League players
Russian Premier League players
Association football goalkeepers
FC Spartak Moscow managers
Russian Premier League managers
Russian expatriate footballers
Expatriate footballers in Germany
Expatriate footballers in Austria
FC Wacker Innsbruck (2002) managers
FC Zhemchuzhina Sochi managers
FC Akhmat Grozny managers
FC Amkar Perm managers
FC Dynamo Moscow managers
Legia Warsaw managers
Russia national football team managers
Russian expatriate football managers
Expatriate football managers in Austria
Expatriate football managers in Poland
Russian expatriate sportspeople in Germany
Russian expatriate sportspeople in Austria
Russian expatriate sportspeople in Poland
2017 FIFA Confederations Cup managers
2018 FIFA World Cup managers
UEFA Euro 2020 managers
Sportspeople from North Ossetia–Alania
FC Tirol Innsbruck players
Russian expatriate sportspeople in Hungary
Expatriate football managers in Hungary
Ferencvárosi TC managers